Didrepanon is a trilobite in the order Phacopida, that existed during the upper Silurian in what is now England. It was described by Philip D. Lane in 1971, and the type species is Didrepanon falcatum. The type locality was in Sedgley.

References

External links
 Didrepanon at the Paleobiology Database

Cheiruridae
Fossil taxa described in 1971
Silurian trilobites of Europe
Fossils of Great Britain
Paleozoic life of the Northwest Territories
Phacopida genera